A by-election was held in the New South Wales state electoral district of Murray on 14 October 2017. The by-election was triggered by the resignation of Adrian Piccoli, former deputy leader of the National Party. The National Party barely retained the seat and, after distribution of preferences, Austin Evans was elected. Helen Dalton, candidate for the Shooters, Fishers & Farmers Party seen a swing of more than 13% on her personal vote building on the 2015 result.

The by-election was held on the same day as by-elections in Blacktown and Cootamundra. The conduct of all three by-elections was administered by the NSW Electoral Commission.

Candidates
The candidates in ballot paper order are as follows:

Results

Adrian Piccoli resigned.

See also
Electoral results for the district of Murray
List of New South Wales state by-elections

References

External links
New South Wales Electoral Commission: Murray State By-election
ABC Elections: Murray by-election

2017 elections in Australia
New South Wales state by-elections